, also known as Nextworld, is a Japanese science fiction manga series, written and illustrated by Osamu Tezuka in 1951.

Plot
Created in a time when the Cold War was becoming hotter, Nextworld is Osamu Tezuka's parody of the tense relationship between the USA (represented as the 'Nation of Stars') and USSR (known in the work as the 'Uran Federation'). The main storyline focuses on atomic tests that create a race of mutant animals known as Fumoon, with psychic powers and intelligence beyond humans, who formulate a plan to evacuate hundreds of animals and a small group of people off the planet Earth. The reason for this is due to a large toxic cloud approaching the Earth, threatening to wipe out all life. Meanwhile, the two warring superpowers draw closer and closer to a confrontation.

Legacy
Next World is the last of Osamu Tezuka's early epic science fiction trilogy, consisting of Lost World (1948), Metropolis (1949) and Next World (1951). They were some of the earliest works featuring steampunk elements, which have since consistently appeared in mainstream manga. These steampunk elements eventually made their way into mainstream anime productions starting in the 1970s, with television shows including Leiji Matsumoto's Space Battleship Yamato (1974), Hayao Miyazaki's Future Boy Conan (1978), and the 1979 anime adaptation of Riyoko Ikeda's manga The Rose of Versailles (1972).

Fumoon

 is a Japanese science fiction anime television film by Osamu Tezuka. It is based on the manga Nextworld.

Plot
The anime film (based on the manga) is similar, but omits characters from the manga. Another difference is that Kenichi (a character who also appears in the Metropolis manga and its anime adaptation) is a teenager in the film, whereas he is a child in the manga.

Cast
 Hiroki Suzuki as Kenichi Shikishima
 Junpei Takiguchi as Dr. Kagashi Yamadano
 Kaneto Shiozawa as Rock Clock
 Kenji Utsumi as Kei Gamata
 Kousei Tomita as Higeoyaji (Shunsaku Ban)
 Mari Okamoto as Rococo
 Minori Matsushima as Peach
 Chikao Ohtsuka as Lednof and Nikolai Rednov 
 Hisashi Katsuta as Dr. Ochanomizu
 Ichirō Nagai as Notarian
 Kazuya Tatekabe as Tabasco
 Kenichi Ogata as Borokin
 Kumiko Takizawa as Cocoa
 Minoru Midorikawa as Suntory Whisky
 Ryoko Kinomiya as Mozu
 Shigezou Sasaoka as Gamata's Thug 
 Tamio Ohki as Dr. Frankenstein

See also
List of Osamu Tezuka anime
List of Osamu Tezuka manga
Lost World (manga)
Metropolis (manga)
Osamu Tezuka
Osamu Tezuka's Star System

References

External links
 Fumoon anime at TezukaOsamu@World
 Tioanime
 

1951 manga
1980 anime films
1980s science fiction films
Anime films based on manga
Japanese animated science fiction films
Manga series
Osamu Tezuka anime
Osamu Tezuka characters
Osamu Tezuka manga
Steampunk anime and manga

ja:来るべき世界 (漫画)